Charles Thomas Cozens is a Canadian musician born in Hamilton, Ontario. His works span several genres including Classical, Classical Crossover, Jazz, Pop, and New Age.

List of works

Select collaborations with artists and orchestras (As composer, arranger and/or conductor) 

 2018 – 2019 Symphonic orchestrations for Indian City and Vince Fontaine in association with the Winnipeg Symphony Orchestra, Charles T. Cozens, arranger
 2016 – 2019 The Burlington New Millennium Orchestra concert series, Charles T. Cozens, founder/conductor
 2016 The Mozart Effect recordings, 2nd international branding with the Mozart Effect Orchestra, Glenn Gould Studio, Charles T. Cozens, conductor
 2014 Randy Bachman’s Symphonic Overdrive with The Kitchener-Waterloo Symphony, Orchestra London, Charles T. Cozens, conductor/arranger/composer; Randy Bachman guitar/vocal
 2014 La Magia Del Cine with The Villa Clara Symphony (Cuba), Charles T. Cozens, conductor/arranger/composer; Janet Horne, violin
 2013 I Am Andrea Menard with The Regina Symphony Orchestra, Charles T. Cozens, conductor/arranger, Andrea Menard, vocalist
 2013 La Danza with The Villa Clara Symphony (Cuba), Charles T. Cozens, conductor/arranger/composer; Allejandro Rodriguez, violin
 2013 Lindi Ortega in Concert with The Winnipeg Symphony Orchestra, Charles T. Cozens, conductor/arranger; Lindi Ortega, vocal/ guitar
 2013 Broadway Today Revival with The Regina Symphony Orchestra, Charles T. Cozens, conductor/arranger/composer; Stephen Patterson, Gisele Fredette, and Helena Janik, vocalists
 2013 Canadian Brass with The Regina Symphony Orchestra, Charles T. Cozens, conductor
 2012 World On A String with The Regina Symphony Orchestra, Charles T. Cozens, conductor/arranger; Michael Guttman, violin
 2012 Concerts with Fernando Lima, countertenor, and Sarena Paton, soprano, at the Lincoln Alexander Centre (Hamilton, ON), Charles T. Cozens, producer/conductor
 2010 Putting It Together with The Winnipeg Symphony Orchestra, Charles T. Cozens conductor/arranger; The Nylons, vocalists
 2008 Eagle and Hawk In Concert as part of the first-ever Indigenous Festival: Winnipeg Symphony Orchestra, Charles T. Cozens, arranger; Alexander Michelwaite, conductor; Eagle And Hawk
 2006 Quartetto Gelato In Concert with The Toronto Symphony Orchestra, Charles T. Cozens, contributing arranger; Quartetto Gelato
 2004 From Harlem To Hollywood Revival with The Hamilton Philharmonic Orchestra, Charles T. Cozens, conductor/arranger; Michael Danso, vocalist
 2004 From Harlem To Hollywood Revival with The Canada Pops Orchestra, Charles T. Cozens, conductor/arranger; Michael Danso, vocalist
 1996 The Pied Piper with The Mississauga Symphony Orchestra, Charles T. Cozens, conductor/composer/arranger; Denis de Laviolette, narrator/vocalist
 1996 The Nylons Live with The Vancouver Symphony Orchestra, Charles T. Cozens, conductor/arranger; The Nylons, vocalists
 1994 Broadway Today with The Hamilton Philharmonic Orchestra, Charles T. Cozens, conductor/arranger/composer/artist
 1994 Bending The Bows with The Kitchener-Waterloo Symphony, Charles T. Cozens, arranger; Brian Jackson, conductor; Leahy & Minevich, violins
 1990 From Harlem To Hollywood with The Hamilton Philharmonic Orchestra, Charles T. Cozens, arranger; Boris Brott, conductor; Michael Danso, vocalist

Select compositions
Musical theatre
 2001 “Swingstep”, A Musical
 1993 “Peter Pan: The Return.” Book and lyrics by Peter Mandia; music by Cozens; adapted from the play and novel by James M. Barrie. (Theatre Aquarius)

Concert music
 2013 "Tres Ballos Latinos" for mixed choir, accordion, piano, bass, and percussion. Commissioned and premiered by Robert Cooper and the Orpheus Choir
 2012 "Homage à Piazzolla" for violin and orchestra.  A recomposition including arrangements and original composition written for Belgian virtuoso Michael Guttman and premiered November 2012 with The Regina Symphony Orchestra
 2010 "Czardahora" commissioned and premiered by Michael Guttman, violin
 2005 "Les Petites Dances Demoniques" commissioned by the Niagara International Chamber Music Festival, Ergo Projects
 2004 "Suite For Children" for Guitar and String Orchestra commissioned by Jason Carter, Helsinki
 2004 "Marionette Fandangle" commissioned by Acclarion
 2002–2003 "Suite For Accordion" commissioned by Joseph Macerollo
 2002 "Fireworks Fantasia" commissioned for the 50th anniversary of the Stratford Festival
 2002 "Three Musketeers Suite" commissioned and premiered by The Canadian Brass
 2000 "Celtic Fantasia" premiered by violinist Michael Guttman and commissioned by Lance Elbeck
 1999 "The Clown Of Venice" commissioned and premiered by Quartetto Gelato.
 1998 "Glory Days", A play with music about the '46 Stelco strike written with Bill Freeman, author
 1998 "Botanicus" for euphonium and brass band commissioned and premiered by the Hannaford Street Silver Band with Bramwell Tovey, conductor
 1994 "Bach Double: Variations" written for Bending the Bows
 1992 "Scrooge: A Christmas Carol". Book and lyrics by Peter Mandia; music by Cozens; adapted from the play and novel by Charles Dickens, Theatre Aquarius
 1990 "Orchestral Miniatures" commissioned by Symphonia Canada

Select arrangements
 2007 Arrangements for the Richard Monette Gala and the Stratford Festival Orchestra
 2002 Arrangements for Stratford Festival's 50th Anniversary
 2001 The Magic of Love Music by Wolfgang Amadeus Mozart; arranged and orchestrated by Charles T. Cozens; Concept and Words by J. Robert Verdun (Port Dover Theatre)

Select discography (As performer, arranger, composer and/or producer)

 2017 Charles Cozens, Mozart Effect 16 CDs Spring Hill
 2015 Quartetto Gelato All Original – 100% Canadian CD Baby
 2012 RyanDan Imagine Universal
 2012 Bob Newhart Rudolph Avalon
 2011 Charles Cozens Aria Solitudes
 2010 Charles Cozens Peaceful Moonlight Avalon
 2009 The Canadian Tenors The Perfect Gift Universal
 2009 The Canadian Tenors The Canadian Tenors (USA) Universal
 2009 Charles Cozens Holiday Piano Classics Avalon
 2008 The Canadian Tenors The Canadian Tenors Universal
 2008 Charles Cozens Timeless Classics Avalon
 2008 Charles Cozens A Celtic Christmas Reflections
 2008 Charles Cozens National Parks Solitudes
 2008 Charles Cozens Sunday Morning Classics Reflections
 2008 Charles Cozens Hollywood Romance Reflections
 2007 Charles Cozens Classical Music For Elegant Occasions Reflections
 2007 Charles Cozens Diamonds Reflections
 2006 Charles Cozens Relaxing Bach Reflections
 2006 Charles Cozens Christmas Soprano Avalon
 2006 Charles Cozens Central Park Solitudes
 2005 David J. Young Silver Lining Sound of Mind
 2005 Charles Cozens Romance Avalon
 2004 Charles Cozens Songbirds At Sunset Solitudes
 2004 Charles Cozens Balance (Juno Nominated) Reflections
 2004 Acclarion Marionette Fandangle Independent
 2004 Erica Goodman Angelic Harp Avalon
 2003 Quartetto Gelato The Orient Express Linus
 2003 Charles Cozens Santa’s Symphony Avalon
 2003 Lance Elbeck Fiddle On Fire Eclectic
 2002 Charles Cozens Andrew Lloyd Webber Reflections
 2002 Charles Cozens Movie Romance Avalon
 2002 Canadian Cast CD The Magic Of Love Eclectic
 2001 Quartetto Gelato Neapolitan Cafe Linus
 2000 Canadian Cast CD Swingstep Silver Fox
 2000 Canadian Cast CD The Three Musketeers Stratford
 2000 Morag Be Free M • E Records
 1999 Hannaford Street Band Heavy Metal CBC SM 5000
 1999 Quartetto Gelato Espresso Victor (Japan)
 1998 Morag For The Moment Makin' Music
 1997 Charles T. Cozens The Entrance Independent
 1995 Michael Farquharson Picture Time Jazz Inspiration
 1994 Michael Farquharson Michael Farquharson Jazz Inspiration
 1993 Bending The Bows Bending The Bows Take A Bow
 1993 Symphonia Canada Orchestral Landscapes 3 Attic Records
 1992 Symphonia Canada Orchestral Landscapes 2 Attic Records
 1991 Symphonia Canada Orchestral Landscapes 1 Attic Records
 1987 Helix Wild In The Streets Capitol
 1986 Symphony Nova Scotia With Glowing Hearts CBC SM 5000

References 

Cozens